The Sons of Iraq ( Abnāʼ al-ʻIrāq) were coalitions between tribal sheikhs in the Al Anbar province in Iraq as well as former Saddam Hussein's Iraqi military officers that united in 2005 to maintain stability in their communities. A moderate group, they were initially sponsored by the General Petraeus and the US military.

After arriving into power, Iraqi Prime Minister Nouri al-Maliki played on religious divides to consolidate his power. Maliki denounced the Son of Iraq as a national threat, actively dismantling them and refusing to integrate them into Iraqi's security services. Sunnis formerly serving with the group were faced with options including becoming unemployed or joining the Islamic State of Iraq and the Levant. This turn of event is considered a key factor in Iraqi failure to stabilize and its 2013–2017 Iraq war.

Other names
The Sons of Iraq were also known by numerous names:
 Anbar's Salvation ( Inqādh al-Anbār)
 National Council for the Salvation of Iraq
 Sunni Salvation movement
 National Council for the Awakening of Iraq
 Sunni Awakening movement

Awakening movements in Iraq are also referred to as:
 "Mercenaries" (Maliki aide, al-Qa'eda)
 U.S. military/Government of Iraq:
 "Concerned Local Citizens" – CLC
 "Sons of Iraq" – SOIZ
 "Very Worried Iraqis"
 "Critical Infrastructure Security" – CIS
 "Abna Al-Iraq" – AAI
 "Sahwa" militia
 "Former Sunni insurgents" – CFR Senior Fellow Steven Simon

Overview

The movement started among Sunni tribes in Anbar Province in 2005 to become an ad hoc armed force across the country in less than a year.

The Awakening fighters in Iraq were credited by many independent analysts with reducing levels of violence in the areas in which they operated; however, the rapid growth of the groups, whose salaries were initially paid for completely by the US military, also led to concerns about allegations of some members' past activities fighting against coalition forces and concerns of infiltration by al-Qaeda. Iraqi Prime Minister Nouri al-Maliki warned that the US-armed 'concerned local citizens' were an armed Sunni opposition in the making, and argued that such groups should be under the command of the Iraqi Army or police.

In 2009, Iraqi Defense Ministry disbanded the Sunni Awakening groups so they would not become a separate military force. Later that year, some Awakening groups threatened to set the streets ablaze and "start a tribal war" after not doing well in elections.

Anbar Awakening
In 2005, the Albu Mahals, a tribe that smuggled foreign fighters and material across the Syria–Iraq border, was being forced out of their territory by the Al Salmani tribe allied with al-Qaeda in Iraq. The tribe proposed an alliance with the local USMC Battalion under the command of LtCol Dale Alford in November 2005, after being forcibly displaced from their traditional base in Al-Qa'im, and began receiving weapons and training. From August to December 2006, the Anbar Province of Iraq was occupied by Al Qaeda (AQI). Much of the stronghold of AQI was in Ramadi, the capital of the Anbar province. The sheikhs and officials were Sunni by sect, so they initially cooperated with AQI to counterbalance the Shiite government and the Shiite insurgents. But later, the terrorism which AQI promoted was not in line with the Sheik's interests. They then joined forces with the US troops in the area, the Iraqi Police and the Provisional Army. They strengthened the city council and dubbed their movement the "awakening". The US and the Iraqi people later gained control of Fallujah and Ramadi. This movement was one of the shining symbols of counterinsurgency policy—rhetoric of the New Way surge policy which George W. Bush outlined in his State of the Union address marked this as the ideal of counterinsurgency. The six points which Bush outlined were met; the people were united to save their city and the US forces gained support of both the officials and citizens.

Despite warnings from some portions of United States intelligence community, Sheik Abdul Sattar Buzaigh al-Rishawi was assassinated along with two bodyguards, by a roadside bomb planted near his home in Ramadi, in September 2007. His brother, Ahmed Abu Risha, took over as leader, but so far has been unable to unite the various awakening militias.

In October 2008, the Iraqi government took over from the American military the responsibility for paying 54,000 members of the Awakening councils. Many of the Awakening fighters put little trust in the Iraqi government to help employ them. "I consider the transfer an act of betrayal by the U.S. Army," said one Awakening member in response to the transfer.

Work in Iraq
The groups were paid by the American military and the Iraqi government to lay down their arms against coalition forces, patrol neighborhoods, and to fight against other Sunni insurgents. The US military says the groups helped it target al-Qaeda in Iraq more precisely and avoid collateral damage. The Washington Post writes the awakening groups caused al-Qaeda in Iraq to soften its tactics in an effort to regain public support.

Al-Qaeda in Iraq condemned the groups for fighting insurgents and for standing by the "filthy crusaders". Some members of the awakening groups were reportedly former insurgents, and some awakening members have been killed by former awakening members in suicide bombings. Sheiks who worked with the awakening movement also frequently faced killings which originated from outside the movement.

The Government Accountability Office, the audit arm of the United States Congress, warned that the groups had still "not reconciled with the Iraqi government" and that the potential remained for further infiltration by insurgents. That report received wide criticism for its lack of factual data and its reliance upon "Green Zone" analysis.

Disbanding
The Shia-dominated Iraqi Defense Ministry has said that it plans to disband the Awakening groups so they do not become a separate military force. "We completely, absolutely reject the Awakening becoming a third military organization," Iraqi Defense Minister Abdul-Qadir al-Obaidi said. Al-Obaidi said the groups also would not be allowed to have any infrastructure, such as a headquarters building, that would give them long-term legitimacy.

The Iraqi government has pledged to absorb about a quarter of the men into the Shiite dominated military and security services, and to provide vocational training to the rest of the members of the Awakening groups. The Iraqi Interior Ministry has agreed to hire about 7,000 men on temporary contracts and plans to hire an additional 3,000; however, the ministry hasn't specified the contract length or specific positions for the men to fill. Deborah D. Avant, director of international studies at the University of California-Irvine, said there are ominous similarities between the awakening councils and armed groups in past conflicts that were used for short-term military gains but ended up being roadblocks for state building.

According to Ramzy Mardini, an Iraq expert at the Jamestown Foundation, "the rise of the Awakening councils may risk reigniting the Jaysh al-Mahdi".  On February 22, 2008, Muqtada al-Sadr announced that he will extend his ceasefire on his Jaysh al-Mahdi militia. But according to Mardini, the uncertainty facing the Sunni tribal Awakening movement's status may cut that ceasefire short. Mardini suggests that if the movement's demands are not satisfied by Iraq's Shia-dominated central government, the U.S. 'surge' strategy is at risk for failing, "even to the point of reverting back to pre-surge status". Subsequent results of the US-UK 2007 "Iraqi Surge" seem to have disproved Mardini's speculation. Those Awakening Council demands include that Awakening fighters be incorporated into Iraq's security forces, having permanent positions and payrolls.

In August 2008, Iraqi Prime Minister Nouri Al-Maliki offered 3,000 of the 100,000 Sons of Iraq members jobs in Diyala Province in hopes that it would lead to information about militants in the area. Other members of the paramilitary were used in the Diyala Campaign.

In March 2009, the leader of the Sunni tribal-based Awakening Movement in Fadhil, Baghdad, was arrested on allegations of murder, extortion and "violating the Constitution". Adel al-Mashhadani was accused of being the Fadhil leader of the banned Baath Party's military wing. His arrest sparked a two-day gunbattle between Awakening members and Shia-dominated government security forces. In November 2009 he was convicted and sentenced to death for murder and kidnapping.

By June 6, 2012, about 70,000 members of the group had been integrated into the Iraqi Security Forces or given civilian jobs, with 30,000 continuing to maintain checkpoints and being paid a salary by the government of around $300 per month. On January 29, 2013, Iraqi Shia-appointed officials said they would raise the salaries of Awakening Council fighters, the latest bid to appease Sunni anti-government rallies that erupted in December, 2012. Some 41,000 Awakening Council fighters are to receive 500,000 Iraqi dinars ($415) a month, up from 300,000 dinars ($250).

On January 21, 2013, the Iraqi Shia-dominated government, announced the execution of 26 men convicted of "terrorism", including Adel Mashhadani, who was arrested in March 2009 and sentenced to death in November of that year for killing a young girl in a revenge attack.

Governorate elections in 2009
Several political parties formed out of the Awakening movements contested the 2009 Iraqi governorate elections. The Iraq Awakening and Independents National Alliance list won the largest number of seats in Anbar Governorate.

Islamic State reprisals
Following the 2010 re-election of Nouri al-Maliki, the Islamic State began a campaign of assassination of Sunni tribal leaders and the remnants of the Awakening movement in Iraq's Al-Anbar province. The drive-by shootings and point-blank assassinations were documented in an Islamic State video called "The Clanging of the Swords."  Between 2009 and 2013, 1,345 Awakening members were killed.  In one town, Jurf al-Sakhar, south of Baghdad, 46 Awakening members were killed in 27 incidents.

See also

 2005 in Iraq
 2006 in Iraq
 2007 in Iraq
 2008 in Iraq
 Abdul Sattar Abu Risha
 Al-Qaeda in Iraq
 Iraqi civil war (2006–2008)
 Iraq War troop surge of 2007
 Saad Ghaffoori

References

External links

 
 
 
 
 
 
 
 
 

2005 establishments in Iraq
Conflicts in 2005
Conflicts in 2006
Conflicts in 2007
Factions in the Iraq War
Iraq–United States relations
Non-military counterinsurgency organizations
Non-military counterterrorist organizations
Occupation of Iraq
Paramilitary forces of Iraq
Politics of Iraq
War on terror